Epermenia orientalis is a moth in the family Epermeniidae. It was described by Reinhard Gaedike in 1966. It is found in Arabia, Iraq, Afghanistan and Pakistan.

References

Epermeniidae
Moths described in 1966
Moths of the Middle East
Moths of Asia
Insects of Afghanistan